Henry Douglas III (born March 3, 1977) is an American former National Football League and Arena Football League offensive specialist (wide receiver/running back combination) for the Los Angeles Avengers, the Chicago Rush and the Columbus Destroyers.

High school career 
Douglas attended Pinecrest High School in Southern Pines, North Carolina, where he was a standout in football, basketball, and track. As a senior, he was a first-team All-Conference pick in football and basketball.

College career 
Henry Douglas played college football at North Carolina A&T.

Professional career 
Douglas entered the National Football League in 1999 when he was signed by the Detroit Lions as an undrafted free agent. From 1999 to 2003, he spent time with the Lions, the Jacksonville Jaguars, and the Carolina Panthers in training camp or on the practice squad. He made the Jaguars active roster in 2002 but did not play a single game.

References

External links 
 Henry Douglas' stats

1977 births
American football running backs
American football wide receivers
Carolina Panthers players
Chicago Rush players
Columbus Destroyers players
Detroit Lions players
Jacksonville Jaguars players
Living people
Los Angeles Avengers players
North Carolina A&T Aggies football players
People from Brooklyn
People from Moore County, North Carolina